Hugh Lyon Tennent (11 May 1817 – 22 January 1874) was a Scottish advocate and pioneer photographer. He is sometimes recorded as Hugh Lyon Tennant.

Life

Tennent was born in Edinburgh on 11 May 1817, the son of  Margaret Rodger Lyon (1794–1867) and Patrick Tennant WS (1782–1872), living at 107 George Street. His older brother Robert had similar interests. His family were related to the Glasgow Tennents of brewery fame.

He followed in his father's career and studied law, qualifying as an advocate in 1840. He became Sheriff Substitute of Lanarkshire in 1853 and Sheriff Substitute of Greenock in 1856, remaining there for the rest of his life.

From 1843 he was a member of the Edinburgh Calotype Club along with his brother and other noted members such as David Brewster and John Cay. Tennent was one of the youngest members. He also joined the Photographic Society of Scotland in 1856. He took many early photographs of the Tennents Wellpark Brewery.

Tennent was a keen sailor and made a trip of the Western Isles in 1838. He was a member of the Royal Clyde Yacht Club, and in later life he had a 15-ton yacht named "Seaward".

A noted philanthropist, he promoted the Discharged Prisoners Aid Society. He was also known as a connoisseur of fine art in Greenock.

He died in Edinburgh on 22 January 1874. He is buried in Dean Cemetery in western Edinburgh. The small simple marker stone lies in the first northern extension not far from his brother Robert.

Family

In 1855 he was married to Agnes Halsey (1833–1913). They had nine children including Henry Edward Tennent (1861-1873) who is buried with them.

References

1817 births
1874 deaths
Photographers from Edinburgh
Scottish lawyers
Scottish photographers
Members of the Faculty of Advocates